Eudonia echo is a moth of the family Crambidae described by Harrison Gray Dyar Jr. in 1929. It is found in western North America from British Columbia to California.

The wingspan is about 15 mm. Adults are on wing from August to October in California.

Subspecies
Eudonia echo echo (Vancouver Island, north-western Washington)
Eudonia echo gartrelli Munroe, 1972 (British Columbia to California)

External links
 
 

Moths described in 1929
Eudonia